Rhododendron calendulaceum, the flame azalea, is a species of Rhododendron native to North America. All parts of this plant are poisonous to humans.

Description 
It is a deciduous shrub, 120–450 cm tall. The leaves are simple, 3–7 cm long, slightly dull green above and villous below. The arrangement is generally alternate, however they appear whorled towards the tips of the branches.

The flowers are 4–5 cm long, usually bright orange, but can vary from pastel orange to dark reddish-orange. These non-fragrant flowers have 4-5 lobes and grow in clusters of 5–10. It typically blooms in late May and early June.

Distribution 
This species of Rhododendron is native to the Appalachian Mountains in the eastern United States, ranging from southern Pennsylvania and Ohio to northern Georgia. It has been reported historically in New York and Maryland, however its current native status in these states is undetermined. However, it can occur as an introduced species in anthropogenic habitats. It occurs naturally in mixed deciduous forests.

Horticulture 
The flame azalea is a popular cultivated plant, primarily due to its showy flowers. Many cultivars and domestic varieties exist, including:

 Chattooga
 Cherokee
 Golden Sunset Flame
 Golden Yellow Flame
 Smokey Mountaineer
 Wahsega

It is also an important parent species in hybrid Azaleas, such as: 

 Ghent
 Knap Hill
 Maid in the Shade
 Mollis
 Northern Lights

See also
 Central and southern Appalachian montane oak forest

References

North Carolina State University

External links

calendulaceum
Flora of the Appalachian Mountains
Flora of the Great Lakes region (North America)
Flora of the Northeastern United States
Flora of the Southeastern United States